Mans de Breish (born as Gérard Pourhomme on January 29, 1949) is a French Occitan language singer from Carcassonne in Occitanie (southern France). He was one of the main figures of Nòva cançon in the 1970s.

Discography 
 Volèm viure al país (Ventadorn, 1975)
 Autonomia (Ventadorn, 1977)
 Flor de luna (2000)
 Alba d'Occitània (2006)
 La guèrra bartassièra (2011)
 Ont se'n va (2017)

References

External links
 Mans de Breish myspace

Occitan music
1949 births
Living people